WCQR-FM (88.3 FM) is a radio station broadcasting a Christian Adult Contemporary music format. Licensed to Kingsport, Tennessee, United States, it serves the Tri-Cities area.  Locally owned by Positive Alternative Radio, Inc., it has been on the air since 1997.

The station was assigned the WCQR-FM call letters by the Federal Communications Commission on December 8, 1995.

WCQR-FM's transmitter is located in the Cherokee National Forest, almost 4,200 feet above sea level.  As a result, despite its modest 1,200-watt power, it provides strong grade B coverage as far as Boone, North Carolina.

References

External links
 WCQR official website
 

CQR-FM
Contemporary Christian radio stations in the United States
Radio stations established in 1995